Cape Race Lighthouse is an active lighthouse located at Cape Race on the Avalon Peninsula, Newfoundland. The light's characteristic is a single white flash every 7.5 seconds; additionally, a foghorn may sound a signal of two blasts every 60 seconds. It is located on one of Canada's busiest shipping lanes. The lighthouse is also a tourist attraction.

History
In 1856, the first lighthouse was installed by the British Government's Trinity House. It was a cast iron tower with a coal oil lamp turned by clockwork. In 1872 the lighthouse keeper was Patrick Myrick; members of his family continued to operate the lighthouse for more than 100 years. In 1886 responsibility for operation of the lighthouse was transferred to the Dominion of Canada.

In 1904 the Marconi Company set up a wireless radio station at the lighthouse. Its optic emitted a one million candle power flash. Great landfall lights like those at Cape Race provided the first sight of land for Atlantic travelers.

After the new tower was built, the original lighthouse was moved to Cape North; it now stands in front of the National Science and Technology Museum in Ottawa.

The Cape Race Lighthouse was in the news in April 1912, when it received the Titanic distress call, an unusual event for radio technology of the era.

The lighthouse was designated a National Historic Site of Canada in 1975.

In 2006, David Myrick, with help from Noel and Liam Myrick - part of a lineage of Myrick lighthouse keepers at Cape Race, contributed wood from the cabinet housing the motor driving the Fresnel to the Six String Nation project. Part of this material serves as the heel brace at the joint of the neck and body of Voyageur, the guitar at the heart of the project.

As of 2020, the current lighthouse keeper is Clifford Doran.

See also
 List of lighthouses in Newfoundland and Labrador
 List of lighthouses in Canada

References

External links

 Aids to Navigation Canadian Coast Guard
 Cape Race Lighthouse Newfoundland and Labrador Tourism

Lighthouses completed in 1856
Lighthouses completed in 1907
Lighthouses in Newfoundland and Labrador
National Historic Sites in Newfoundland and Labrador
Lighthouses on the National Historic Sites of Canada register